The Fens and Anglian system is a collection of  rivers in East Anglia in England that are navigable and for which the Environment Agency is the navigation authority.

Many of the rivers drain The Fens  between  Cambridgeshire and Lincolnshire. These comprise River Glen, Great Ouse, River Nene,  and  River Welland. The Environment Agency is organising the Fens Waterways Link a major construction project to link these rivers for navigation. The first stage is the South Forty-Foot Drain.

Two East Anglian rivers in the grouping are physically separate from the Fens network. These are the River Ancholme in North Lincolnshire which connects to the Humber estuary, and the River Stour which is in Suffolk.

The Environment Agency supervises craft registration for these rivers.

See also
List of rivers of England

References

Canals in England
Rivers of England
Rivers of Cambridgeshire
Rivers of Lincolnshire